Gabriac is the name of two communes in France:

In France
 Gabriac, Aveyron, in the department of Aveyron
 Gabriac, Lozère, in the department of Lozère

zh:加布里阿克